Jacques de Féraudy (1886–1971) was a French stage and film actor. He also worked as a screenwriter and directed three films during the silent era.

He was the son of the actor Maurice de Féraudy.

Selected filmography
 Tillers of the Soil (1923)
 In Old Alsace (1933)
 Martha (1935)
 Dear Caroline (1949)
 The Treasure of Cantenac (1950)
 Deburau (1951)
 Marianne of My Youth (1955)
 If Paris Were Told to Us (1956)

References

Bibliography
 Klossner, Michael. The Europe of 1500-1815 on Film and Television. McFarland, 2002.

External links

1886 births
1971 deaths
French male stage actors
French male film actors
Male actors from Paris